Quli Qaseh (also Romanized as Qūlī Qaṣeh; also known as Solţānābād) is a village in Zanjanrud-e Pain Rural District, Zanjanrud District, Zanjan County, Zanjan Province, Iran. At the 2006 census, its population was 779, in 193 families.

References 

Populated places in Zanjan County